= Mohammad Al-Malki =

Qatari footballer (born 1990)

Personal information
- Full name: Mohammad Khamis Al-Malki
- Date of birth: 6 December 1990 (age 35)
- Place of birth: Qatar
- Height: 1.75 m (5 ft 9 in)
- Position: Midfielder

Youth career
- Al Ahli

Senior career*
Years	Team	Apps	(Gls)
2009–2015	Al Ahli		
2015–	Umm Salal		
- * Club domestic league appearances and goals

Mohammad Al-Malki (Arabic: محمد المالكي; born 6 December 1990) is a Qatari footballer. He currently plays for Umm Salal.
